The 1984 Copa Libertadores de América Finals was the final two-legged tie to determine the champion of the 1984 edition. It was contested by Argentine club Independiente  and Brazilian club Grêmio. The first leg of the tie was played on 24 July at Estádio Olímpico Monumental with the second leg played on 27 July at Estadio Libertadores de América.

Independiente won the series 1–0 on aggregate.

Qualified teams

Format
The finals were played over two legs; home and away. The team that accumulates the most points —two for a win, one for a draw, zero for a loss— after the two legs would be crowned the champion. If the two teams were tied on points after the second leg, a playoff in a neutral venue would become the next tie-breaker. Goal difference was going to be used as a last resort.

Matches summary

First leg

Second leg

References

1984 in South American football
Copa Libertadores Finals
C
C
Football in Avellaneda